The Mount Oliver Incline was a funicular on the South Side of Pittsburgh, Pennsylvania.  It was designed in 1871 by the Prussian-born engineer John Endres and his American daughter Caroline Endres, one of the first women engineers in the United States. 

Its track was 1600 feet long and gained 377 feet of elevation. It ran from the corner of Freyburg and South Twelfth streets at its lower end to Warrington Avenue at its upper end. It was closed on 6 July 1951.

See also
 Knoxville Incline
 List of funicular railways
 List of inclines in Pittsburgh
 Pittsburgh, Knoxville & St. Clair Electric Railroad

References

External links

 Pittsburgh Historic Maps

Railway inclines in Pittsburgh
Defunct funicular railways in the United States
Railway lines opened in 1872
Railway lines closed in 1951
1951 disestablishments in Pennsylvania
1872 establishments in Pennsylvania